Junya Tanaka (田中 順也) is a Japanese footballer born in 1987.

Junya Tanaka may also refer to:
Junya Tanaka (footballer, born 1983) (田中 淳也), Japanese footballer